Live on Tour in the Far East Vol. 3 is a live album led by saxophonist Billy Harper recorded in 1991 in Korea and released on the SteepleChase label. The album followed two additional volumes recorded on the same tour.

Reception 

In his review for AllMusic, Don Snowden states "maybe this one is the best single disc of the three. It's got the best sound, bright and well-balanced, and fans of extended jazz blowing will appreciate hearing three pieces (the shortest clocks in at just under 21 minutes) on a night when the musicians are really on and totally in synch with one another".

Track listing 
All compositions by Billy Harper
 "Soran-Bushi-B.H." - 23:47
 "Call of the Wild and Peaceful Heart" - 20:47
 "Cry of Hunger" - 31:38

Personnel 
Billy Harper - tenor saxophone
 Eddie Henderson - trumpet
Francesca Tanksley - piano
Louie Spears - bass
Newman Taylor Baker - drums

References 

1993 live albums
Billy Harper live albums
SteepleChase Records live albums